Admiral Norton may refer to:

Harold Percival Norton (1855–1933), U.S. Navy rear admiral
James Norton (admiral) (1789–1835), English-born Imperial Brazilian Navy rear admiral
Nancy A. Norton (born 1964), U.S. Navy vice admiral
Stanley C. Norton (1894–1978), U.S. Navy rear admiral